Frederick Andrew (28 April 1940 – 2007) was a British biathlete. He competed in the 20 km individual event at the 1968 Winter Olympics.

References

External links
 

1940 births
2007 deaths
British male biathletes
British male cross-country skiers
Olympic biathletes of Great Britain
Olympic cross-country skiers of Great Britain
Biathletes at the 1968 Winter Olympics
Cross-country skiers at the 1964 Winter Olympics
People from Newtownards